Patrizio Oliva (born 28 January 1959) is an Italian former professional boxer, who won the gold medal in the light welterweight division at the 1980 Moscow Olympics as an amateur and the WBA light welterweight title as a professional.

Early life
Patrizio is one of seven brothers born to Rocco and Catena Oliva.

Oliva was introduced to boxing through his father Rocco and his brother Mario's passion for the sport. One of his brothers, Ciro, died and Oliva dedicated a number of his fights to the memory of Ciro and also named his first son after him.

Amateur career
Oliva had a successful amateur career and won 93 of his 96 fights winning the Italian, European and Olympic titles.

At international level Oliva won the 1978 European Junior Championships in Dublin, Ireland and silver medal at the 1979 European Senior Championships in Cologne, West Germany. Oliva was beaten by Russian boxer Serik Konakbayev in the final of the Cologne championship and stated that his fight against Konakbaev was the hardest of his career. The following year he represented his country and boxed at the Olympic Games for Italy and would again face Konakbaev.

1980 Olympics
Following two years of winning European title Oliva competed in the blue vest of Italy at the 1980 Summer Olympics, which were held in Moscow, USSR.

Oliva competed in the Light Welterweight (– 63.5 kg) division. He defeated Beninese Aurelien Agnan in his first contest after referee stopped contest in first round. In his second contest he stopped Syrian Farez Halabi in the third round and beat Yugoslavian Ace Rusevski in the quarter final. In the semi final Oliva faced British boxer Tony Willis. This fight went the full three round distance and Oliva was once again victorious after all five judges gave him the decision.

On 2 August 1980, Oliva once again met his opponent from the final of the 1979 European championships, Serik Konakbaev, in the final of the Olympics. This time Oliva reversed the result by beating Konakbaev in front of his home crowd to take the gold medal and win the Val Barker Trophy for being "Outstanding Boxer" at the 1980 Olympics.

Olympic results
Defeated Aurelien Agnan (Benin) RSC-1
Defeated Farez Halabi (Syria) RSC-3
Defeated Ace Rusevski (Yugoslavia) 3–2
Defeated Tony Willis (Great Britain) 5–0
Defeated Serik Konakbayev (Soviet Union) 4–1

Professional career

Debut
Within two months of winning gold at the Moscow Olympics, Oliva turned professional. His first fight was on 11 October 1980 against Italian based Brazilian Nelson Gomes in Naples, Italy. Oliva defeated Gomes on points over six rounds to secure his first victory as a professional.

Early fights
After Oliva's first win in the professional ranks, he then went on a run of victories. From October 1980 to August 1981, Oliva won thirteen straight fights before he fought for his first title belt, the Italian light welterweight title against Giuseppe Russi on 4 November 1981 in Ischia. Oliva handled Russi with ease winning the title with a second round knockout. Oliva followed his first title win by winning a further eleven straight fight between November 1981 and October 1982.

European title
This left Oliva with a record of 25 victories with no losses and earned him a fight against Frenchman Robert Gambini for a chance to win for his first major title, the European light welterweight title. Oliva was again victorious and took the title from Gambini on points over twelve rounds. Gambini retired from boxing after the fight.

Oliva continued his run of career victories by winning his first 48 fights, including a victory over Ubaldo Nestor Sacco in 1986 to capture the WBA light welterweight title. Oliva defended the title four times prior to losing to Juan Martin Coggi by KO in 1987. After a two-year rest, Oliva came back and went on to win his next 9 fights, setting up a shot at WBC welterweight title holder James McGirt in 1992. Oliva lost via unanimous decision, and retired after the bout with a record of 57–2–0.

References

External links
 
 

1959 births
Living people
Italian male boxers
Light-welterweight boxers
Boxers at the 1980 Summer Olympics
Olympic boxers of Italy
Olympic gold medalists for Italy
Olympic medalists in boxing
Medalists at the 1980 Summer Olympics
World Boxing Association champions
Boxers from Naples
Mediterranean Games bronze medalists for Italy
Mediterranean Games medalists in boxing
Competitors at the 1979 Mediterranean Games
20th-century Italian people